Randi is both a given name, and a nickname in the English language, popular in North America and Norway. It is primarily a feminine name, although there is recorded usage of the name by men.  It may have originated as a pet form of Miranda or as a feminine form of Randy. In turn, Randy was originally derived from the names Randall, Randolf, Randolph, Bertrand and Andrew.

In Norway, Randi is a feminine name that emerged in the 1400s as a short form of Ragnfrid. The original meaning in Old Norse is "God-lovable". Ragnfríðr was famously used about three different people in runic inscriptions from the Viking era. Later the variant Rangdid was common in the Middle Ages. Over 20 people with the name were mentioned in the Regesta Norvegica. By the 1600s the variant Randi was a common feminine name in Norway.

Women known as Randi

 Randi Altschul (born 1960), American toy inventor
 Randi Anda (1898–1999), Norwegian politician
 Randi Bakke (1904–1984), Norwegian pair skater
 Randi Becker (born 1948), American politician from Washington
 Randi Bjørgen (born 1947), Norwegian trade unionist
 Randi Blehr (1851–1928), Norwegian feminist
 Randi Brænne (1911–2004), Norwegian actress
 Randi Bratteli (1924–2002), Norwegian journalist
 Randi Elisabeth Dyrdal ( 1974–1977), Norwegian handballer
 Randi Hutter Epstein, American medical writer
 Randi Flesland (born 1955), Norwegian civil servant
 Randi Gaustad (born 1942), Norwegian curator and art historian
 Randi Gustad (born 1977), Norwegian handball player
 Randi Hansen (born 1958), Norwegian singer
 Randi Heide Steen (1909–1990), Norwegian singer 
 Randi Helseth (1905–1991), Norwegian singer
 Randi Hultin (1926–2000), Norwegian jazz critic
 Randi Karlstrøm (born 1960), Norwegian politician
 Randi Kaye (born 1967), American journalist
 Randi Laubek (born 1973), Danish singer and songwriter
 Randi Leinan (born 1968), Norwegian footballer (soccer player)
 Randi Levine, American author, arts advocate, and diplomat
 Randi Lunnan (born 1963), Norwegian organizational theorist and professor
 Randi Martinsen, American geologist
 Randi Michelsen (1903–1981), Danish actress
 Randi Miller (born 1983), American wrestler
 Randi Monsen (1910–1997), Norwegian illustrator
 Randi Lindtner Næss (1905–2009), Norwegian actress and singer
 Randi Oakes (born 1951), American actress and fashion model
 Randi Øverland (born 1952), Norwegian politician
 Randi Rahm, American fashion designer
 Randi Rhodes (born 1959), American radio personality
 Randi Mayem Singer, American writer and producer
 Randi Solem (1775–1859), Norwegian religious organiser
 Randi Malkin Steinberger (born 1960), American photographer, filmmaker, author, and curator
 Randi Thorvaldsen (1925–2011), Norwegian speedskater
Randi Vestergaard Evaldsen (born 1984), Greenlandic politician
 Wang Randi (born 1991), Chinese swimmer
 Randi Wardum (born 1986), Faroese football goalkeeper and handballer
 Randi Weingarten (born 1957), American trade union leader
 Randi Zuckerberg (born 1982), American businesswoman

Fictional characters
 Randi Fronczak, desk clerk in the medical drama ER
 Randi Hubbard, All My Children character
 Randi McFarland, character on the TV show Highlander
 Randi, the main protagonist of the video game Secret of Mana

See also
 
 

English-language feminine given names
English masculine given names
English-language masculine given names
English-language unisex given names